C. C. Williams House, also known as the Biddlecomb House and Cummings Apartment House, is a historic home located at Clinton, Henry County, Missouri.  It was built about 1867, and is two-story, "T"-shaped, Italianate style frame dwelling. It sits on a sandstone foundation with southern mansion front and hipped cross-gable roof.

It was listed on the National Register of Historic Places in 1995.

References

Houses on the National Register of Historic Places in Missouri
Italianate architecture in Missouri
Houses completed in 1867
Buildings and structures in Henry County, Missouri
National Register of Historic Places in Henry County, Missouri